Engaeus curvisuturus is a species of crayfish in the family Parastacidae. It is endemic to the Yarra Ranges region of Victoria, Australia.

References

Sources
Doran, N. and Horwitz, P. 2010. Engaeus curvisuturus. IUCN Red List of Threatened Species 2010. retrieved 5 February 2017

Parastacidae
Freshwater crustaceans of Australia
Taxonomy articles created by Polbot
Crustaceans described in 1990